Waydowntown (stylized as waydowntown) is a 2000 film directed by Gary Burns and starring Fab Filippo, Don McKellar, Marya Delver and Michelle Beaudoin. The film is a dark comedy that explores office culture and its effects and often uses surrealism to achieve its thematic goals.

The film is set in Calgary, Alberta, where many downtown buildings are connected by the Plus 15, an extensive network of indoor skywalks.  Because of this network, the hustle and bustle of the traditional "main street" has been replaced by recirculated air, food courts, and fluorescent lights.  The result is a bleak and often humorous dark comedy about Canadian corporate culture.

Plot 
The film centres on a group of office colleagues in downtown Calgary, Alberta, who bet a month's salary on who can last the longest without going outside by using the system of covered walkways that connect the buildings. The film takes place over one lunch hour on day 24 of the month-long competition.  Things start to become complicated as the office prepares for the company founder's retirement party.

The film's title is derived from a particular form of suicide where one smashes the (non-openable) window of one's high-rise office and then jumps through. In the movie, one of the characters has accumulated a 2-litre pop bottle full of marbles in the hopes of breaking his window. The dark joke for this is referenced in the film as: "a 15 bus takes you downtown, [but] a bottle of marbles takes you way downtown."

Cast
Fab Filippo as Tom Bennett
Don McKellar as Brad
Marya Delver as Sandra West
Gordon Currie as Curt Schwin
Jennifer Clement as Vicki
Tammy Isbell as Kathy
Tobias Godson as Randy
James McBurney as Phil

Production
The majority of the film was shot in TD Square, the Calgary Eaton Centre, and Bankers Hall. The company's offices are situated in the TD Canada Trust Tower. The low-budget film was shot on digital and later transferred to 35 mm.

Reception
The film has a 70% freshness rating on Rotten Tomatoes. Most critics praise the satirical elements, casting, and plot. Others find the film to be humourless and incomplete, and the plot to be too nonsensical and uninteresting. The film won the Best Canadian Film Award prize at the 2000 Toronto International Film Festival.

The film was shown at the Calgary International Film Festival on September 19, 2019, to celebrate its 20th anniversary.

See also 

 Office Space

References

External links 
Waydowntown website
 
 
AV Club DVD Review

2000 films
2000s business films
English-language Canadian films
Canadian black comedy films
Films directed by Gary Burns
Films set in Calgary
Films shot in Calgary
Canadian satirical films
2000 black comedy films
2000 comedy films
2000s English-language films
2000s Canadian films
Canadian independent films
2000 independent films